Fighting Lawman is a 1953 American Western film directed by Thomas Carr, produced by Vincent M. Fennelly, and written by Daniel B. Ullman. It stars Wayne Morris, Virginia Grey, John Kellogg, and Harry Lauter.

Cast
 Wayne Morris as Deputy Marshal Jim Burke 
 Virginia Grey as Raquel Jackson  
 John Kellogg as Lem Slade, aka Sam Logan  
 Harry Lauter as Outlaw Al Clark - aka Al Deacons  
 John Pickard as Jack Harvey aka Jack Martin  
 Rick Vallin as Manuel Jackson  
 Myron Healey as Sheriff Dave Wilson  
 Dick Rich as Webb

References

Bibliography
 Martin, Len D. The Allied Artists Checklist: The Feature Films and Short Subjects of Allied Artists Pictures Corporation, 1947-1978. McFarland & Company, 1993.

External links
 

1953 films
1953 Western (genre) films
American Western (genre) films
Films directed by Thomas Carr
Allied Artists films
Films scored by Raoul Kraushaar
American black-and-white films
1950s English-language films
1950s American films